Tettigoides is an extinct genus of katydids containing a single species, Tettigoides pectinata. It is the only genus and species in the subfamily Tettigoidinae. It is known from Ypresian aged deposits near Dinmore, Queensland, Australia.

References

†
†